List of gifted and talented programs is a list of gifted education programs located all across the world.

Africa

Egypt
S.T.E.M Egypt located in Cairo, a girl's branch in Maadi, a boy's branch in the 6th of October district and a mixed branch in El Obour City

Nigeria
 The Federal Government Academy, located in Niger State, Nigeria, also known as the Suleja Academy, founded in 1986.

Asia

China
Special Class for the Gifted Young of University of Science and Technology of China

Hong Kong
 The Hong Kong Academy for Gifted Education, located in Shatin, Hong Kong, also known as the HKAGE, founded in 2007.
 The Program for the Gifted and Talented (Link), Faculty of Education, The Chinese University of Hong Kong, located in Shatin, Hong Kong, also known as the PGT, founded in 1995.
Provided by The University of Hong Kong: Primary School Programs ,Secondary Programs and the Academy for the Talented

India
 Jawahar Navodaya Vidyalaya for the talented and gifted students predominantly from rural background without regards to their family's socio-economic conditions, located in almost every districts of India, founded in 1986.

Iran
 The National Organization for Development of Exceptional Talents, located in multiple districts of Iran, founded in 1986.

Jordan
 The Jubille School, located in Amman, Jordan, also known as The Jubilee Institute, founded in 1993.
 The King's Academy, located in Madaba-Manja, Jordan, founded in 2007.

Republic of Korea
 The Daegu Science High School, located in Daegu, South Korea, founded in 1987.
 The Gyeonggi Science High School, located in Suwon, South Korea, founded in 1983.
 The Korea Science Academy of KAIST, located in Busan, South Korea, founded in 1991.
 The Seoul Science High School for Gifted Students, located in Seoul, South Korea, founded in 1989.

Malaysia
 The PERMATApintar National Gifted Center, located in Selangor, Malaysia, founded in 2009.
 Kolej GENIUS Insan. located in Nilai, Malaysia, founded in 2010

Singapore
Gifted Education Programme

Israel
 The Larom program , located in Kiryat Malachi, Israel.

Vietnam
 List of high schools for the gifted in Vietnam

Europe

Austria
Sir-Karl-Popper-Schule, Vienna

Czech Republic
Talnet

Denmark
Mentiqa schools

Germany
Landesgymnasium St Afra for gifted students
Landesgymnasium für Hochbegabte Schwäbisch Gmünd

Greece
CTY Greece at Anatolia College

Republic of Ireland
Centre for the Talented Youth of Ireland

Norway
Mentiqa-school at Slottsfjellskolen, Tønsberg, County of Vestfold (Awaiting approval from The Norwegian Directorate for Education and Training)

Poland
Polish Children's Fund

Serbia
Matematička Gimnazija
Petnica Science Center

Switzerland
Talenta

United Kingdom
Young Gifted and Talented Programme
National Association for Gifted Children
Gift Summer School

Turkey 

 TEV İnanç Türkeş High School for Gifted Students

North America

Canada
Alberta
G.A.T.E.
Westmount Charter School

British Columbia
Choice School for the Gifted and Exceptional
MACC (Multi Age Cluster Class)
University Transition Program

Ontario
Academy for Gifted Children
Cedarview Middle School
Lorne Park Secondary School
Martingrove Collegiate Institute
The Woodlands School
Woburn Collegiate Institute

Quebec
Centennial Regional High School

Saskatchewan
Walter Murray Collegiate Institute
Bedford Road Collegiate Institute

United States
As of 2002, only 37 US states have laws requiring that some services be made available for the gifted. Of these, approximately 28 require that the services must be adequate to meet the educational needs of every gifted student. There is one federal law with respect to gifted education. The Jacob K. Javits Gifted & Talented Student Education Act of 1988 was renewed as part of the Elementary and Secondary Education Act in 1994 and as part of the No Child Left Behind Act of 2001.

Alabama
Alabama School of Mathematics and Science

Arizona
Flex Center
Alhambra Elementary School District

California
Gifted and Talented Education (G.A.T.E.)
Education Program for Gifted Youth and High School at Stanford University
Early Entrance Program, Los Angeles, California
MCP Middle and High School, Santa Cruz, California
Helios School, Sunnyvale, California
Tessellations School, Cupertino, California

Colorado
Rocky Mountain Talent Search and The Logan School for Creative Learning at the University of Denver

Connecticut
Jewish High School of Connecticut Gifted Program

Florida
Pine View School, Osprey

Illinois
Office of Academic Enhancement in Chicago Public Schools
Northwestern University Center for Talent Development
Illinois Mathematics and Science Academy

Indiana
Indiana Academy for Science, Mathematics, and Humanities
Gifted Education Resource Institute, Purdue University

Kentucky
Center for Gifted Studies at Western Kentucky University
Summer Program for Verbally and Mathematically Precocious Youth
Gatton Academy
Liberal Arts Academy at Henry Clay High School

Louisiana
Louisiana School for Math, Science, and the Arts

Maryland
Center for Talented Youth at Johns Hopkins University

Massachusetts
Acera School
Bard College at Simon's Rock

Michigan
The Roeper School

Mississippi
Mississippi School for Mathematics and Science

Nevada
Davidson Institute for Talent Development

New York
The Anderson School
Frederick Law Olmsted School
Henry Viscardi School
Hunter College High School
Long Island School for the Gifted
Prep for Prep
Special Music School
Speyer Legacy School

North Carolina
North Carolina School of Science and Mathematics
Talent Identification Program at Duke University

Ohio
The Schilling School for Gifted Children
Menlo Park Academy

South Carolina
Palmetto Scholars Academy

Texas
School for the Talented and Gifted
Texas Academy of Mathematics and Science at University of North Texas
Texas Academy of Leadership in the Humanities at Lamar University

Virginia
Center for Gifted Education at College of William & Mary
Program for the Exceptionally Gifted at Mary Baldwin University

Washington
Open Window School, Bellevue, WA

Pacific Ocean

Australia
New South Wales
Gifted Education Research, Resource and Information Centre (GERRIC), The University of New South Wales
 Selective school: Government high schools where students are admitted based on academic merit.
Gifted and Talented Program, Macquarie University
The University of New England - gifted programs at the undergraduate, Masters level, Graduate Certificate, and Research at Ph.D. and Doctoral level (online).

Queensland
Queensland Association for Gifted and Talented Children

South Australia
Ignite programme, Department of Education and Children's Services
Australian Science and Mathematics School

Philippines
Philippine Science High School (various campuses)
Regional Science High School (various campuses)
Engineering and Science Education Program (various public or private science high schools)

South America

Brazil

Brasília - Distrito Federal
Programa de Enriquecimento para Superdotados e Talentosos

Conselho Brasileiro de Superdotação (ConBrasSD)

Associação de Pais, Professores e Amigos dos Alunos com Altas Habilidades/Superdotação do Distrito Federal (APAHS-DF)

Minas Gerais
Centro para Desenvolvimento do Potencial e Talento (CEDET)

Paraná
Instituto Para Otimização de Talentos (INODAP)

Núcleo de Estudos e Práticas em Altas Habilidades e Superdotação (NEPAHS)

Rio de Janeiro
Instituto Rogério Steinberg (IRS)

São Paulo
Associação Paulista para Altas Habilidades/Superdotação (APAHSD)

Instituto Social Para Motivar, Apoiar e Reconhecer Talentos (ISMART)

Instituto Alpha Lumen (IAL)

Núcleo de Apoio Pedagógico Especializado (CAPE)

References

Gifted education